Maria J. Esteban (born at Alonsotegi, 1956) is a Basque-French mathematician. In her research she studies nonlinear partial differential equations, mainly by the use of variational methods, with applications to physics and quantum chemistry. She has also worked on fluid-structure interaction.

Education and career
After undergraduate studies at the University of the Basque Country (Bilbao), she did her PhD thesis at the Pierre and Marie Curie University (Paris), under the direction of Pierre-Louis Lions. After her thesis, she became full-time researcher at CNRS, where she holds now a position of director of research. She is a member of CEREMADE, research center of the Université Paris-Dauphine.

Service
Esteban was president of International Council for Industrial and Applied Mathematics for the 2015–2019 term. She was president of the Société de Mathématiques Appliquées et Industrielles from 2009 to 2012 and chair of the Applied Mathematics Committee of the European Mathematical Society in 2012 and 2013. She participated in the Forward Look on "Mathematics and Industry" funded by the European Science Foundation and is one of the launchers of the EU-MATHS-IN European network for industrial mathematics.  She was member of the Abel Prize committee in 2014 and 2015.

Recognition
She became a Fellow of the Society for Industrial and Applied Mathematics in 2016 "for distinguished research in partial differential equations and for advancing the profile of applied mathematics internationally."
She was an invited speaker at the 2018 International Congress of Mathematicians
In 2019 she received the SIAM Prize for Distinguished Service to the Profession, and became a member of the Academia Europaea. In 2020, she received the French Academy of Science's Prix Jacques-Louis-Lions. In 2021, she receives the Blaise Pascal Medal in Mathematics of the European Academy of Sciences.

Major publications

References

External links

 Personal webpage.
 "Maria J. Esteban, World-Class Mathematician" – CNRS International magazine
 . ICIAM 2011, Vancouver
 Interviewat  Fondation sciences mathématiques de Paris.
 

1956 births
Living people
People from Alonsotegi
French mathematicians
French women mathematicians
Fellows of the Society for Industrial and Applied Mathematics
Members of Academia Europaea